Ronald Leslie Doyle Boswell  (born 9 December 1940) is an Australian former politician. He represented the Nationals in the Australian Senate for Queensland from 1983 to 2014 and led the party in the Senate from 1990 to 2007. He became Father of the Senate in 2008.

Early life
Boswell was born in Perth, Western Australia and was educated at St Joseph's College, Gregory Terrace, Brisbane, Queensland.

Career 

He was the leader of the National Party in the Senate from 10 April 1990 to 3 December 2007 and held many positions in the Coalition shadow ministry including Shadow Minister for Regional Development and External Territories (from September 1988 to April 1990), Shadow Minister for Northern Australia and External Territories (April 1993 to May 1994) and Shadow Minister for Consumer Affairs (May 1994 to December 1994). Boswell was appointed Parliamentary Secretary to the Minister for Transport and Regional Services in July 1999 but left the position in October 2003. After he was succeeded as leader of the Nationals in the Senate by Nigel Scullion following the 2007 election, Boswell became Scullion's deputy. He was succeeded in that position by Fiona Nash in 2008.

In 2011, Boswell was a critic of the then Australian Government's carbon emissions trading scheme. He called for the scheme to be abandoned. On 17 September 2012, during a Senate debate on a proposed marriage inequality bill, Boswell spoke out against same sex marriage in Australia stating: "Two mothers or two fathers can’t raise a child properly. Who takes the boy to football? Who tells him what's right from wrong? What does he do? Go along with mum, or two mums? How does he go camping or fishing? It won’t work, it’s defying nature!" At the same time he remained an outspoken opponent of fringe conservative movements such as the Australian League of Rights and One Nation.

Boswell announced on 21 September 2012 that he did not intend to seek re-election in 2013 and would retire when his Senate term expired in 2014.

References

External links
 

1940 births
Living people
Liberal National Party of Queensland members of the Parliament of Australia
National Party of Australia members of the Parliament of Australia
Members of the Australian Senate
Members of the Australian Senate for Queensland
Politicians from Perth, Western Australia
Delegates to the Australian Constitutional Convention 1998
20th-century Australian politicians
People educated at St Joseph's College, Gregory Terrace
21st-century Australian politicians
Officers of the Order of Australia